The Rural Municipality of Coteau No. 255 is a rural municipality (RM) in the Canadian province of Saskatchewan within Census Division No. 7 and  Division No. 3.

History 
The RM of Coteau No. 255 incorporated as a rural municipality on December 12, 1910.

Geography 
The RM's eastern boundary runs along the shore of Lake Diefenbaker.

Communities and localities 
The following urban municipalities are surrounded by the RM.

Resort villages
 Coteau Beach

The following unincorporated communities are within the RM.

Organized hamlets
 Hitchcock Bay

Localities
 Birsay
 Dunblane
 Lyons
 Tichfield Junction
 Tullis

Demographics 

Attractions 
 Gardiner Dam
 Lucky Lake Heritage Marsh
 Hitchcock's Hideaway Archaeological Field School
 Hitchcock Cabin
 Elbow Harbour Provincial Recreation Site
 Elbow Museum / Mistusinne Cairns

Government 
The RM of Coteau No. 255 is governed by an elected municipal council and an appointed administrator that meets on the second Monday of every month. The reeve of the RM is Clayton Ylioja while its administrator is Lindsay Hargrave. The RM's office is located in Birsay.

Transportation 
 Saskatchewan Highway 44
 Saskatchewan Highway 45
 Saskatchewan Highway 373
 Saskatchewan Highway 646
 Big Sky Rail (AGT Foods)
 Lucky Lake Airport

See also 
List of rural municipalities in Saskatchewan

References 

C